Chuck Baker is a Canadian folk-rock singer and guitarist from Stayner, Ontario, who has been a member of the rock band Left by Snakes alongside vocalist Tony Burgess. They received a Canadian Screen Award nomination for Best Original Song at the 11th Canadian Screen Awards in 2023 for "The Ascension Song", written for the film Cult Hero.

He has also released the solo albums A Little Piece of Quiet (2006), Every Flat Earth (2012) and In a Room (2012).

References

External links

21st-century Canadian guitarists
21st-century Canadian male singers
Canadian folk rock musicians
Canadian songwriters
Musicians from Simcoe County
Living people
People from Clearview, Ontario